Majengo is an administrative ward in the Monduli District of the Arusha Region of Tanzania. According to the 2012 census, the ward has a total population of 7,853.

References

Wards of Monduli District
Wards of Arusha Region